Judith Mary Murray, OBE (née Erskine; born 8 September 1959) is a Scottish tennis coach. She is the mother of professional tennis players Jamie and Sir Andy Murray.

Life and career
Murray was born on 8 September 1959 in Bridge of Allan, Stirlingshire, the daughter of Eileen Shirley (née Edney) and Roy Erskine, an optician and former footballer who had played for Stirling Albion in the 1950s. She says that growing up, there were no indoor tennis courts in Scotland, so she played tennis in the summer and badminton in the winter. She won 64 titles in Scotland during her junior and senior career, and decided to have a go at the professional tour in around 1976. Murray gave up the idea of competing professionally as she was homesick and was robbed in Barcelona. However, she had played against players such as Debbie Jevans and Mariana Simionescu. Murray claims that her playing style did not have any big shots but she was quick around the court and read the game well. She decided to go to the University of Edinburgh to study French and German, before dropping German in favour of business studies. In 1981, she graduated from the University of Edinburgh, and represented Great Britain at the World Student Games. She began coaching and was the initial coach for both her sons before handing over the reins as their professional careers bloomed.  In the early 1980s, Murray lived in the West End of Glasgow and was a member of Broomhill Lawn Tennis and Squash club, winning the Club Championships three times and playing for its teams (under her maiden name). She remains a visitor to the club.

Aside from her own sons, she has coached many players at regional and national level under the auspices of the British tennis governing body, the Lawn Tennis Association (LTA). In December 2011 she was elected to lead the British Fed Cup team as their captain. She says she took the job in part to raise the profile of female coaches and alleviate some of the sexism that she says remains in the sport. She resigned as Great Britain's Fed Cup Captain in March 2016.

Murray was appointed Officer of the Order of the British Empire (OBE) in the 2017 Birthday Honours for services to tennis, women in sport, and charity.

She is a trustee of the Judy Murray Foundation, a registered charity under Scottish law, with the object of improving access to tennis opportunities across Scotland.

In 2018, Murray appeared as a contestant on The Chase Celebrity Christmas Special.

In 2020, Murray appeared as a contestant on Celebrity Masterchef. Murray was given the 2021 Georgina Clark Mother Award from the Women's Tennis Association.

Honorary Doctorates
Murray was awarded an Honorary Doctorate by the University of Edinburgh on 8 October 2013. On 22 November 2013 Murray received an honorary doctorate from the University of Stirling. She received three honorary degrees in 2016 – one from the University of Aberdeen, another from the University of Glasgow, and a third  from Abertay University for her "outstanding contribution to British sport."

Park of Keir
The proposed development was rejected by Stirling Council in December 2015.

Strictly Come Dancing
On 7 September 2014 Murray was introduced as a competitor in the 12th series of BBC One's Strictly Come Dancing, paired with professional dancer Anton du Beke. In week eight at Blackpool, however, after dancing a Viennese Waltz to "Let's Go Fly a Kite" from Mary Poppins, the pair had one of the lowest two scores. They were eliminated by a unanimous vote from the judges. Writing in The Daily Telegraph, Michael Hogan tagged his review of the show "Ballroom justice at last as the popular but wooden Mrs Murray leaves Strictly", describing the last dance: "It was Murray’s best yet – not saying much, maybe – scoring her first (and only) sevens. She was even more delighted by her four from Craig Revel Horwood."

3 Score from guest judge Donny Osmond.

Personal life 

Judy is currently unmarried. She has been married once before. In 1980 when she was 21 and known as Judy Erskine, she tied the knot with William Murray, a regional manager for the Scottish newsagent chain RS McColl. The two welcomed their first child, Jamie, in 1986 and became a family of four just over a year later when Andy was born. Judy and William Murray divorced in 2005.

In February 2021 Murray revealed that she had undergone a £4,500 non-surgical face lift after her sons teased her for her "turkey neck".

Publications
Knowing the Score: My Family and Our Tennis Story. London: Chatto & Windus, 2017. Co-written with Alexandra Heminsley. .

References

External links
The Judy Murray Foundation

1959 births
Living people
British female tennis players
Scottish female tennis players
Sportspeople from Dunblane
Scottish sports coaches
Scottish tennis coaches
Alumni of the University of Edinburgh
Officers of the Order of the British Empire